Michael Riddell (23 March 1953 – 26 March 2022) was a New Zealand Christian minister and writer.

Early life
Riddell was born in Porirua East (now Cannons Creek), New Zealand, and began schooling at Porirua East Primary School. He was the youngest of a family of four, with two sisters and a brother. His family moved to Christchurch, where he continued schooling at Northcote Primary School, while living near the Styx River. Secondary schooling took place at Christchurch Boys' High School, complete with Army Cadets and regular rugby. In the sixth form, he switched from sciences to arts.

He flew to Australia, hitchhiking up the east coast from Adelaide to Cairns, and spending some time living in a hippie commune in the rainforest north of Cairns. A return to New Zealand saw him hold down a succession of jobs long enough to earn a fare to the United Kingdom. He hitchhiked around Europe and Northern Africa. He returned to London, where he met Rosemary, a New Zealander who became his lifetime partner, and travelled back to New Zealand via Asia.

Riddell was accepted for the New Zealand Baptist Theological College in Auckland, so the family moved there in 1979. During the time at College, Riddell was involved in protest against the 1981 South Africa rugby union tour of New Zealand. The family moved to Switzerland in 1982, where Riddell pursued postgraduate studies in Theology at an international seminary near Zurich, graduating summa cum laude at the end of 1984.

Religious career
Riddell returned to New Zealand, and was ordained and appointed minister of Ponsonby Baptist Church, a small congregation in the central city. Here he was to remain for some nine years. He held a variety of jobs concurrent with that of minister, as a journalist for New Outlook, a current affairs journal, and later as a part-time lecturer at Baptist College. His first book, Godzone: A Guide to the Travels of the Soul, was published in 1992.

While minister of Ponsonby Baptist, Riddell was instrumental in establishing the Community of Refuge Trust, a community housing initiative providing accommodation for psychiatric patients and low-income tenants. He was actively involved in local affairs and served for a time on the Ponsonby Community Committee. In 1991, Riddell was involved in a confrontation with Auckland City Council over the proposed sale of Council housing in the Freemans Bay Area.  He informed the councillors that they were stripping their city's poor of their dignity and leaving them naked.

Riddell resigned from being minister at Ponsonby Baptist in 1993. He became a lecturer in theological education, teaching under the University of Auckland School of Theology bachelor's degree.

Writing career
In 1997, Flamingo published his first novel, The Insatiable Moon. Riddell moved to Dunedin, where he become a Catholic layman, and wrote full-time. He produced another ten books, the play Jerusalem, Jerusalem, and a screenplay of The Insatiable Moon, a feature film released in New Zealand in October 2010.

In 2003 he completed his PhD through the University of Otago, on James K. Baxter's contribution to New Zealand spirituality.

Publications

Fiction 
 The Insatiable Moon (1997)
 Deep Stuff (1999)
 Masks & Shadows (2000)

Non-fiction 
 Godzone: A Guide to the Travels of the Soul (1992)
 Alt.Spirit@Metro.M3: Alternative Spirituality for the Third Millennium (1997)
 God's Home Page - A Journey Through the Bible for Postmodern Pilgrims (1998)
 Threshold of the Future - Reforming the Church in the Post-Christian West (1998)
 Sacred Journey - Spiritual Wisdom for Times of Transition (2000)
 The Prodigal Project with Mark Pierson and Cathy Kirkpatrick, SPCK (2000)

References

External links
 Official site
 www.whitcoulls.co.nz

1953 births
2022 deaths
New Zealand writers
University of Otago alumni
Emerging church movement
People from Porirua
New Zealand crime fiction writers
People educated at Christchurch Boys' High School
New Zealand Baptist ministers